Sōtō Zen or  is the largest of the three traditional sects of Zen in Japanese Buddhism (the others being Rinzai and Ōbaku). It is the Japanese line of the Chinese Cáodòng school, which was founded during the Tang dynasty by Dòngshān Liánjiè. It emphasizes Shikantaza, meditation with no objects, anchors, or content. The meditator strives to be aware of the stream of thoughts, allowing them to arise and pass away without interference.

The Japanese brand of the sect was imported in the 13th century by Dōgen Zenji, who studied Cáodòng Buddhism abroad in China. Dōgen is remembered today as the co-patriarch of Sōtō Zen in Japan along with Keizan Jōkin.

With about 14,000 temples, Sōtō is one of the largest Japanese Buddhist organizations. Sōtō Zen is now also popular in the West, and in 1996 priests of the Sōtō Zen tradition formed the Soto Zen Buddhist Association based in North America.

History

Chinese origins

The original Chinese version of Sōtō-shū, i.e. the Caodong-school (曹洞宗) was established by the Tang dynasty monk Dongshan Liangjie (洞山良价 Ja: Tōzan Ryōkai) in the ninth century.

One prevalent view is that the sect's name was originally formed by taking one character each from the names of Dongshan and his disciple Caoshan Benji (曹山本寂, Tōzan Ryōkai), and was originally called Dongcao sect (with the characters in transposed order). However, to paraphrase the Dongshan Yulu (《洞山語録》, "Record of the Dialogues of Dongshan"), the sect's name denotes 'colleagues (曹) of the teachings above the caves (洞)' who together follow the "black wind (teachings of Taoism?)" and admire the masters of various sects.

Perhaps more significantly for the Japanese brand of this sect, Dōgen among others advocated the reinterpretation that the "Cao" represents not Caoshan, but rather "Huineng of Caoxi temple" ; zh:曹溪慧能). The branch that was founded by Caoshan died off, and Dōgen was a student of the other branch that survived in China.

A precursor to the sect is Shítóu Xīqiān (Ch. 石頭希遷, ca.700 – ca.790), the attributed author of the poem Sandokai, which formed the basis of  Song of the Precious Mirror Samadhi of Dongshan Liangjie (Jp. Tōzan Ryōkai) and the teaching of the Five Ranks.

Kamakura (1185–1333)

Dōgen
The Caodong-teachings were brought to Japan in 1227, when Dōgen returned to Japan after studying Ch'an in China and settled at Kennin-ji in Kyoto. Dōgen had received Dharma transmission from Tiantong Rujing at Qìngdé Temple, where Hongzhi Zhengjue once was abbot. Hongzhi's writings on "silent illumination" had greatly influenced Dōgen's own conception of shikantaza.

Dōgen did return from China with various kōan anthologies and other texts, contributing to the transmission of the koan tradition to Japan. In the first works he wrote he emphasised the practice of zazen, which brought him into trouble at Kennin-ji:

In 1243 Dōgen founded Eihei-ji, one of the two head temples of Sōtō-shū today, choosing...

Daily routine was copied from Chinese practices, which went back to the Indian tradition:

Ejō

Dōgen was succeeded around 1236 by his disciple Koun Ejō (1198–1280), who originally was a member of the Daruma school of Nōnin, but joined Dōgen in 1229. Ejō started his Buddhist studies at Mount Hiei, the center of Tendai studies. Following his stay there he studied Pure Land Buddhism under Shōkū, whereafter he joined the Daruma school of Nōnin by then led by Kakuan.

Ejō, like Dōgen, believed in the primacy of Zen Buddhism. He resisted efforts from outside to water down the tradition with other beliefs.

Gikai
A large group from the Daruma-school under the leadership of Ekan joined the Dogen-school in 1241, after severe conflicts with the Tendai and Rinzai schools. Among this group were Gikai, Gien and Giin, who were to become influential members of Dōgen's school.

After the death of Ejō, a controversy called the sandai sōron occurred. In 1267 Ejō retired as Abbot of Eihei-ji, giving way to Gikai, who was already favored by Dogen. Gikai too originally was a member of the Daruma school, but joined Dōgen's school in 1241, together with a group from the Nōnin school led by Ekan. Gikai introduced esoteric elements into the practice:

Opposition arose, and in 1272 Ejō resumed the position of abbot. After his death in 1280, Gikai became abbot again, strengthened by the support of the military for magical practices. Opposition arose again, and Gikai was forced to leave Eihei-ji, and exiled to Kaga Province, Dajō-ji (in Ishikawa Prefecture). He was succeeded by Gien, who was first trained in the Daruma-school of Nōnin. His supporters designated him as the third abbot, rejecting the legitimacy of Gikai.

Keizan

The second most important figure in Sōtō, Keizan, belonged to this dissident branch. Keizan received ordination from Ejō when he was, twelve years old, shortly before Ejō's death When he was seventeen he went on a pilgrimage for three years throughout Japan. During this period, he studied Rinzai, Shingon and Tendai. After returning to Daijō-ji, Keizan received dharma transmission from Gikai in 1294, and established Joman-ji. In 1303 Gikai appointed Keizan as abbot of Daijō-ji, a position he maintained until 1311.

Keizan enlarged the Shingon-temple Yōkō-ji in Ishikawa prefecture, turning it into a Zen monastery in 1312. Thereafter he inherited the Shingon temple Shogaku-ji in 1322, renaming it Sōji-ji, which was recognized as an official monastery. In 1324 he put Gasan Jōseki in charge of Sojo-ji, and returned to Yōkō-ji. Yōko-ji was Keizan's main temple, but Sōji-ji thrived better, thanks to Gasan Jōseki

Though today Dōgen is referred as the founder of Sōtō, for a long period Sōtō history recognized several important ancestors, next to Dōgen. In 1877 the heads of the Sōtō community acknowledged Keizan for a brief period as the overall founder of the Sōtō sect.

Dogen is known as the "koso", where Keizan is known as the "taiso";

Sōtō centers
At the end of the Kamakura period, Dōgen's school centered around four centers, namely Eihei-ji, Daijo-ji monastery, and the temples Yoko-ji and Soji-ji. Soji-ji became the most influential center of the Dōgen school.

Muromachi (or Ashikaga) (1336–1573)
During the Muromachi period the Rinzai school was the most successful of the schools, since it was favoured by the shōgun. But Soto too spread out over Japan.

Gasan and Sotetsu
Gasan Jōseki (1275–1365) and Meiho Sotetsu were Keizan's most prominent students.

Gasan too started his Buddhist studies at mount Hiei. He became head of Soji-ji in 1324. Gasan adopted the Five Ranks of Tung-shan as a fit vehicle to explain the Mahayana teachings.

Sotetsu became head of Yoko-ji in 1325. Initially his influence soon grew. In 1337 Sotetsu was appointed as abbot of Daijo-ji.

Azuchi-Momoyama (1573–1600) and Edo (or Tokugawa) (1600–1868)
After a period of war Japan was re-united in the Azuchi–Momoyama period. Neo-Confucianism gained influence at the expense of Buddhism, which came under strict state control.  The power of Buddhism decreased during the Tokugawa period. Buddhism had become a strong political and military force in Japan and was seen as a threat by the ruling clan. Measures were taken to control the Buddhist organisations, and to limit their power and influence. The temple hierarchy system was centralized and unified.

Japan closed the gates to the rest of the world. New doctrines and methods were not to be introduced, nor were new temples and schools. The only exception was the Ōbaku lineage, which was introduced in the 17th century during the Edo period by Ingen, a Chinese monk. The presence of these Chinese monks also influenced the existing Zen-schools, spreading new ideas about monastic discipline and the rules for dharma transmission.

The Sōtō school started to place a growing emphasis on textual authority. In 1615 the bakufu declared that "Eheiji's standards (kakun) must be the rule for all Sōtō monks". In time this came to mean all the writings of Dōgen, which thereby became the normative source for the doctrines and organisation of the Sōtō school.

A key factor in this growing emphasis on Dogen was Manzan's appeal to change the rules for dharma transmission, based on arguments derived from the Shōbōgenzō. From its beginnings, Sōtō-shū has laid a strong emphasis on the right lineage and dharma transmission. In time, dharma transmission became synonymous with the transmission of temple ownership. When an abbot changed position, becoming abbot of another temple, he also had to discard his lineage and adopt the lineage of his new temple. This was changed by Manzan Dokahu (1636–1714), a Sōtō reformer, who ...

Dōgen scholarship came to a central position in the Sōtō sect with the writings of Menzan Zuihō (1683–1769), who wrote over a hundred works, including many commentaries on Dōgen's major texts and analysis of his doctrines. Menzan promoted reforms of monastic regulations and practice, based on his reading of Dōgen.

Another reformation was implemented by Gentō Sokuchū (1729–1807), the 11th abbot of Eihei-ji, who tried to purify the Sōtō school, de-emphasizing the use of kōans. In the Middle Ages kōan study was widely practiced in the Sōtō school. Gentō Sokuchū started the elevation of Dōgen to the status he has nowadays, when he implemented new regulations, based on Dōgen's regulations.

This growing status of Dōgen as textual authority also posed a problem for the Sōtō school:

Meiji Restoration (1868–1912) and Imperial expansionism

During the Meiji period (1868–1912) Japan abandoned its feudal system and opened up to Western modernism. Shinto became the state religion, and Buddhism was coerced to adapt to the new regime. Rinzai and Sōtō Zen chose to adapt, with embarrassing consequences when Japanese nationalism was endorsed by the Zen institutions. War endeavours against Russia, China and finally during the Pacific War were supported by the Zen establishment.

Within the Buddhist establishment the Western world was seen as a threat, but also as a challenge to stand up to. Parties within the Zen establishment sought to modernize Zen in accord with Western insights, while simultaneously maintaining a Japanese identity.

During this period a reappraisal of Dōgen started. The memory of Dōgen was used to ensure Eihei-ji's central place in the Sōtō organisation, and "to cement closer ties with lay people". In 1899 the first lay ordination ceremony was organized in Eihei-ji. Eihei-ji also promoted the study of Dōgen's works, especially the Shōbōgenzō, which changed the view of Dōgen in Sōtō's history. An image of Dōgen was created that suited the specific interests of Eihei-ji:

Lay interests
Funerals continue to play an important role as a point of contact between the monks and the laity. Statistics published by the Sōtō school state that 80 percent of Sōtō laymen visit their temple only for reasons having to do with funerals and death, while only 17 percent visit for spiritual reasons and a mere 3 percent visit a Zen priest at a time of personal trouble or crisis.

Monastic training

In a piece of advice to western practitioners, Kojun Kishigami Osho, a dharma heir of Kōdō Sawaki, writes:

According to Kishigami, practice may as well be undertaken elsewhere:

Spread in the western world
In the 20th century Sōtō Zen spread out to the west.

Shunryū Suzuki

Shunryū Suzuki played a central role in bringing Sōtō to the west. Suzuki studied at Komazawa University, the Sōtō Zen university in Tokyo. In 1959 Suzuki arrived in California to attend to Soko-ji, at that time the sole Sōtō temple in San Francisco. His book Zen Mind, Beginner's Mind has become a classic in western Zen culture. Suzuki's teaching of Shikantaza and Zen practice led to the formation of the San Francisco Zen Center, one of the largest and most successful Zen organizations in the West. The training monastery of the San Francisco Zen center, at Tassajara Hot Springs in central California, was the first Buddhist Monastery to be established outside Asia. Today SFZC includes Tassajara Monastery, Green Gulch Farm, and City Center. Various Zen Centers around the U.S. are part of the dharma lineage of San Francisco Zen Center and maintain close organizational ties with it.

Suzuki's assistant Dainin Katagiri was invited to come to Minneapolis, Minnesota, where he moved in 1972 after Suzuki's death. Katagiri and his students built four Sōtō Zen centers within Minneapolis–Saint Paul.

Sanbo Kyodan

The Sanbo Kyodan, in which Sōtō and Rinzai are merged, is also of central importance western Sōtō Zen. Their lineage, starting with Hakuun Yasutani, includes Taizan Maezumi, who gave dharma transmission to various American students, among them Tetsugen Bernard Glassman, Dennis Genpo Merzel disrobed in disgrace, Charlotte Joko Beck and John Daido Loori.

In Europe the Sanbo Kyodan has been influential via Hugo Enomiya-Lassalle, and via students of Dennis Genpo Merzel, especially in the Netherlands.

Sanbo Kyodan was also connected to the Soen Nakagawa–Eido Tai Shimano lineage, (disgraced), due to a personal fondness of Soen for the teaching practices of Harada roshi, who was the teacher of Hakuun Yasutani.

Antai-ji

The Antaiji-based lineage of Kōdō Sawaki is also widespread. Sawaki's student and successor as abbot Kōshō Uchiyama was the teacher of Shōhaku Okumura who established the Sanshin Zen Community in Bloomington, Indiana, and his student Gudō Wafu Nishijima was Brad Warner's teacher. Another of Sawaki's students, Taisen Deshimaru, travelled to France where he became Kaikyosokan (head of Japanese Soto Zen for a particular country or continent) in Europe. Deshimaru founded the Association Zen Internationale in 1970, which is now the oldest and largest Zen association in Europe, with affiliated sanghas in France, Spain, Germany, Italy, the United Kingdom and other countries.

Soto Zen Buddhist Association
The larger majority of North American Sōtō priests joined in 1996 to form the Soto Zen Buddhist Association. While institutionally independent of the Japanese Sōtōshū, the Sōtō Zen Buddhist Association works closely with what most members see as their parent organization. With about one hundred fully transmitted priests, the Sōtō Zen Buddhist Association now represents about 80% of Western Sōtō teachers. The Soto Zen Buddhist Association approved a document honoring the women ancestors in the Zen tradition at its biannual meeting on October 8, 2010. Female ancestors, dating back 2,500 years from India, China, and Japan, may now be included in the curriculum, ritual, and training offered to Western Zen students.

Practice
Daily services in Sōtō monasteries include chanting of sutras and dharanis.

Shikantaza
In the Sōtō school of Zen, Shikantaza, meditation with no objects, anchors, or content, is the primary form of practice. The meditator strives to be aware of the stream of thoughts, allowing them to arise and pass away without interference.

Considerable textual, philosophical, and phenomenological justification of this practice can be found throughout Dōgen's works:

Other important texts promoting zazen are the Shōbōgenzō, and the "Principles of Zazen" and the "Universally Recommended Instructions for Zazen".

Sōtō versus Rinzai
Sōtō Zen was often given the derogatory name "farmer Zen" because of its mass appeal. Some teachers of Zen would say that the reason why it was called "farmer Zen" was because of its down-to-earth approach, while the Rinzai school was often called "samurai Zen" because of the larger samurai following. The latter term for the Rinzai can be somewhat misleading, however, as the Sōtō school also had samurai among its rosters.

Texts

Sutras

Sōtō Zen, like all of Zen, relies on the Prajnaparamita Sutras, as well as general Mahayana Buddhist sutras, such as the Lotus Sutra, the Brahma Net Sutra and the Lankavatara Sutra. Zen is influenced in large part by the Yogacara school of philosophy as well as the Huayan school.

Until the promotion of Dogen studies in modern times, the study of Chinese texts was prevalent in Sōtō:

Sōtō Zen texts 
Shih-t'ou Hsi-ch'ien's (Shitou Xiqien, Sekito Kisen, 700–790) poem "The Harmony of Difference and Sameness" is an important early expression of Zen Buddhism and is chanted in Sōtō temples to this day.

One of the poems of Tung-shan Liang-chieh, the founder of Sōtō, "The Song of the Jewel Mirror Awareness" is also chanted in Sōtō temples. Another set of his poems on the Five Positions (Five Ranks) of Absolute and Relative is important as a set of kōans in the Rinzai school.

Other texts typically chanted in Sōtō Zen temples include the Heart Sutra (Hannyashingyō), and Dōgen's Fukanzazengi (Universally Recommended Instructions for Zazen).

Dōgen
Dōgen's teaching is characterized by the identification of practice as enlightenment itself. This is to be found in the Shōbōgenzō. The popularity of this huge body of texts is from a relatively recent date:

The study of Dōgen, and especially his Shobogenzo, has become the norm in the 20th century:

Organisation

The Sōtō-shū organisation has an elaborate organisation. It consists of about 15,000 temples. There are circa 30 training centers, where Sōtō monks can train to become an oshō or priest and run their own temple.

Head and parliament

Sōtō-shu has a centralised organisation, run by a head:

Temples
Contemporary Sōtō-shū has four classes of temples:
 , head temples, namely Eihei-ji and Sōji-ji;
 Kakuchi, teaching monasteries, where at least once a year an ango (ninety-day retreat) takes place;
 Hōchi, dharma temples;
 Jun hōchi, ordinary temples.

While Eihei-ji owes its existence to Dōgen, throughout history this head temple has had significantly fewer sub-temple affiliates than the Sōji-ji. During the Tokugawa period, Eiheiji had approximately 1,300 affiliate temples compared to Sōji-ji's 16,200. Furthermore, out of the more than 14,000 temples of the Sōtō sect today, 13,850 of those identify themselves as affiliates of Sōji-ji. Additionally, most of the some 148 temples that are affiliates of Eiheiji today are only minor temples located in Hokkaido—founded during a period of colonization during the Meiji period. Therefore, it is often said that Eiheiji is a head temple only in the sense that it is head of all Sōtō dharma lineages.

Legal status
The Sōtū-shū is an "umbrella (hokatsu) organization for affiliated temples and organizations". It has "three sets of governing documents":
 Sōtōshū Constitution (Sotoshu shuken);
 Regulations for the Religious Juridical Person Sōtōshu (Shūkyō hōnin Sōtōshū kisoku);
 Sōtōshū Standard Procedures (Sōtōshū kitei).

See also

Persons
 Shunryū Suzuki
 Taizan Maezumi
 Kōdō Sawaki
 Gudō Wafu Nishijima
 Muhō Noelke
Practice
 Kōan
 Shikantaza
 Zazen
Chinese Chán
 Chinese Chán
 Caodong
Japanese Zen
 Japanese Zen
 Japanese Buddhism
Temples
 Eihei-ji
 Antai-ji

Notes

References

Book references

Web-references

Sources

 
 
 
 
 
 
 
 
 
 
 
 
 
 
 
 
 
 
 
 Koho, K.C. (2000) Sōtō Zen: An Introduction to the Thought of the Serene Reflection Meditation School of Buddhism, Shasta Abbey Press, 
 
 
 
 
 
 
 
 
 
 
 
 
 
 
 
 
 
 
Warner, Brad (2007). Sit Down and Shut Up: Punk Rock Commentaries on Buddha, God, Truth, Sex, Death, & Dōgen's Treasury of the Right Dharma Eye, New World Library, 
 Williams, D. R. (2004) The Other Side of Zen: A Social History of Sōtō Zen Buddhism in Tokugawa Japan (Buddhisms: A Princeton University Press Series), Princeton University Press,

External links
Japan
 Sōtō Zen International Official homepage of the Sōtō school of Zen.
Europe
 Order of the Prairie Wind An independent order of ordained Sōtō Zen Buddhist priests founded by Rev. Nonin Chowaney.
 The Norwegian Sōtō Zen Buddhist Order. (Defaults to Norwegian text. English text selectable.)
 The International Zen Association  Founded by Master Taisen Deshimaru in France for Europe.
 The IZA in the UK  IZAUK is an affiliate of the International Zen Association.
USA
 The Order of Buddhist Contemplatives The Order of Buddhist contemplatives founded by Rev. Master P.T.N.H. Houn Jiyu-Kennett.
 San Francisco Zen Center One of the largest American Sōtō Zen centers, founded by Shunryū Suzuki Roshi and his American students in 1962. SF Zen Center's Tassajara Zen Mountain Center was the first Sōtō Zen training monastery established in North America.
 Shasta Abbey Buddhist Monastery Official homepage of the Sōtō Zen Buddhist Abbey near Mount Shasta, CA.
 Sōtō Zen Buddhist Association
History and academic studies
 thezensite: Dogen studies Collection of academic articles and studies on Dōgen

Soto Zen
Buddhist orders

ja:曹洞宗#日本における曹洞宗